Akdepe District (Акдепе этрабы) is a district of Daşoguz Province in Turkmenistan. The administrative center of the district is the town of Akdepe.

Districts of Turkmenistan
Daşoguz Region